Polonghera is a comune (municipality) in the Province of Cuneo in the Italian region Piedmont, located about  south of Turin and about  north of Cuneo.

Polonghera borders the following municipalities: Casalgrasso, Faule, Moretta, Murello, Pancalieri, and Racconigi.

References

External links
 Official website

Cities and towns in Piedmont